In the 1995–96 season, USM Alger competed in the Division 1 for the 20th time They competed in Ligue 1, the Algerian League Cup, and the Algerian Cup. In 1995–96 season Ifticen left USM Alger despite achieving the underlined goal to be replaced by Nour Benzekri, The team signed six players duo of AS Aïn M'lila the goalkeeper Laïd Belgherbi, Abdelmalek Khouni and the duo of NA Hussein Dey, Nacer Zekri and Billel Dziri also Toufik Brakni and Nabil Mehdaoui, In Algiers Derby who played in Omar Hamadi Stadium and after USM Alger scored a goal, the assistant referee was injured by smoke gases, to stop and be repeated behind closed doors in the same stadium. After that it was decided that the Algiers Derby would not be played in the future in this stadium with the presence of the fans. After a great struggle with MC Oran for the title and in the last round USM Alger won the title after its victory against CS Constantine at Stade Mohamed Hamlaoui, with a difference of only two points, it is the first in 33 years and the second in its history.

Squad list
Players and squad numbers last updated on 8 January 1996.Note: Flags indicate national team as has been defined under FIFA eligibility rules. Players may hold more than one non-FIFA nationality.

Competitions

Overview

Division 1

League table

Results summary

Matches

Algerian Cup

Algerian League Cup

Group A

Squad information

Appearances and goals

|-

|-
! colspan=12 style=background:#dcdcdc; text-align:center| Players transferred out during the season

Goalscorers
Includes all competitive matches. The list is sorted alphabetically by surname when total goals are equal.

Transfers

In

Out

References

External links
 

USM Alger seasons
Algerian football clubs 1995–96 season